Alloborborus is a genus of flies belonging to the family lesser dung flies.

Species
A. pallifrons (Fallén, 1820)

References

Sphaeroceridae
Schizophora genera
Diptera of Europe
Taxa named by Oswald Duda